Tony William Negus  is an Australian diplomat and retired police officer who was the Commissioner of the Australian Federal Police (AFP), being sworn in on 7 September 2009 for a five-year term. He was the sixth Commissioner of the AFP and the second appointed from within the AFP. On 1 December 2014, he was appointed Australian High Commissioner to Canada, effective on 15 January 2015.

Education
Negus holds a master's degree in Public Policy and Administration, and a Graduate Diploma in Executive Leadership. At Harvard University he has completed the Executive Leadership Program.

Career
Negus started his law enforcement career in traffic operations in Canberra in 1982, and later as a detective in the Australian Capital Territory. He worked in community policing, federal investigations, human resources, and protection as well as in national operations in Brisbane, Sydney, and Canberra.

In June 2005, Negus was awarded the Australian Police Medal (APM). One year later, in July 2006, Negus was appointed National Manager of Human Resources, with responsibility for learning and development, professional standards, and people strategies. Before he was appointed as Commissioner of the AFP he had been Deputy Commissioner Operations since October 2007, where he had responsibility for border operations, economic and special operations, forensics and data centres, high technology crime operations, internal liaison networks, and international deployments.

He stepped down from his role as Commissioner at the end of his term in September 2014 and was replaced by his former deputy Andrew Colvin.

See also
Australian Federal Police
Law enforcement in Australia

References

External links
 AFP Police Commissioner official website; accessed 18 January 2015
 Profile, thepowerindex.com.au; accessed 18 January 2015

Living people
Harvard Business School alumni
Commissioners of the Australian Federal Police
High Commissioners of Australia to Canada
People from the Australian Capital Territory
People from New South Wales
Officers of the Order of Australia
Recipients of the Australian Police Medal
Place of birth missing (living people)
Year of birth missing (living people)